The A92 is a major road that runs through Fife, Dundee, Angus, Aberdeenshire, and Aberdeen City in Scotland. From south to north, it runs from Dunfermline to Blackdog, just north of Aberdeen.

History
The A92's original route in southern Fife is now numbered as the A921. It connects with the M90 junction 1 via Burntisland and Kirkcaldy and links into the Thornton bypass.

Plans were drawn up in the 1960s for a new East Fife regional dual carriageway road starting at the M90 at Masterton (Junction 2), which would have mirrored what is now the A921 and B9157 to the Mossgreen area, before heading north-eastward to Chapel Level, connecting up with the Thornton By-pass.  The plans were held back until the early 1970s, and were held back further due to the Oil crisis. During the 1970s the Scottish Development Department commissioned a new traffic study which concluded that the A92 should follow the more northern route to provide a better link for Cowdenbeath and Lochgelly before connecting directly onto the Thornton Bypass, which was completed by early 1983.

The new section between Crossgates and Glenrothes began construction in 1980, and was built in four phases:

 Thornton By-pass: Opened on 16 August 1983 
 Halbeath - Cowdenbeath: Opened in September 1985
 Cowdenbeath - Lochgelly: Opened on 13 August 1987
 Lochgelly - Thornton: the final phase which opened on 16 July 1990

In early April 1998 the A92 was extended beyond the Crossgates junction to provide direct access with the M90 southbound, to ease congestion around the Halbeath interchange. The new section was built three months ahead of schedule, costing £8.4m.

Numbering 
The A92 formerly continued north from Stonehaven through Aberdeen, and terminated at Fraserburgh. The section between Stonehaven and Aberdeen was renumbered A90 in 1994. Upon completion of the Aberdeen Western Peripheral Route (AWPR) in 2018, the section between Stonehaven and Blackdog was once again numbered as A92. The section between Blackdog and Fraserburgh has now been renumbered A90 and A952.

The section of the A92 between Dundee and Aberdeen was formerly part of the Euroroute system, on route E120, a closed loop connecting Inverness, Aberdeen, Dundee and Perth.

Route
Starting at its junction with the M90 motorway near Dunfermline, it runs north east past Cowdenbeath, Lochgelly, Kirkcaldy, Glenrothes, Ladybank and Newport-on-Tay.  The road is a dual carriageway from the M90 to Glenrothes town centre, changing to a single carriageway as it passes through the northern side of the town, before switching back to dual carriageway north of Glenrothes (until it meets the A912 towards Perth and the A914 towards St Andrews), it reverts to a single carriageway until a few miles short of the Tay Road Bridge at Dundee.  The section through Fife is often described as the East Fife Regional Road.

Across the Tay Road Bridge, the A92 continues along the east coast past Monifieth, Carnoustie, Muirdrum, Arbroath, Montrose, Inverbervie and the Fowlsheugh Nature Reserve before reaching Stonehaven where the road once again becomes dual carriageway. From here, the A92 runs parallel with the A90 for around 2 miles. The road then continues past Stonehaven and Portlethen heading into and through the city of Aberdeen before terminating at Blackdog, where the road once again merges with the A90.

The 16-mile section of the road from Dundee to Arbroath was upgraded to dual carriageway standard in 2005 and significantly reduced the journey time between the two towns. Between Arbroath and Stonehaven the road is a single carriageway apart from a very short section of dual carriageway near Gourdon. The road returns to dual carriageway from Stonehaven heading north to Aberdeen, briefly returning to single carriageway at the Bridge of Dee, and then again returning to single carriageway between the Haudagain and Parkway roundabouts in Aberdeen. The remainder of the road from the Parkway roundabout to the termination point at Blackdog is dual carriageway.

Archaeological
The A92 road traverses lands on which prehistorical archaeological sites are present. Examples of these features include Gourdon Hill and the Stone of Morphie, both situated slightly to the west of the A92 alignment.

References

Links
 https://web.archive.org/web/20130725093503/http://www.ciht.org.uk/motorway/m90inveperth.htm
 http://www.sabre-roads.org.uk/wiki/index.php?title=A92
 http://www.sabre-roads.org.uk/wiki/index.php?title=East_Fife_Regional_Road

Roads in Scotland
Transport in Fife
Transport in Dundee
Transport in Angus, Scotland
Transport in Aberdeenshire